This is a list of listed buildings in Middelfart Municipality, Denmark.

''Note:: This list is incomplete. A complete list of listed buildings in Middelfart Municipality can be found on Danish Wikipedia.

The list

References

External links

 Danish Agency of Culture

 
Middelfart